Dinesh Fernando is a former Sri Lankan cricketer. He was a right-handed batsman who played for Nondescripts Cricket Club.

Fernando made a single first-class appearance for the side, during the 1994-95 Saravanamuttu Trophy season, against Moratuwa Sports Club. From the lower order, he scored 12 runs in the only innings in which he batted.

References

External links
Dinesh Fernando at Cricket Archive 

Sri Lankan cricketers
Nondescripts Cricket Club cricketers
Living people
Year of birth missing (living people)